Halland County held a county council election on 14 September 2014, on the same day as the general and municipal elections.

Results
The number of seats remained at 71 with the Social Democrats winning the most at 23, an increase of two from in 2010. The party received 30.4% of a total valid vote of 202,352. The combined centre-right parties were still larger as a bloc, although lost their overall majority.

Municipal results

Images

References

Elections in Halland County
Halland